Opisthonema is a genus of herrings, the thread herrings, found in tropical waters of the Western Hemisphere.  They get their name from a filamentous nature of the last ray of the dorsal fin.  Currently, five species are in this genus.

Species
 O. berlangai Berry & Barrett, 1963 (Galapagos thread herring)
 O. bulleri] (Regan, 1904) (slender thread herring)
 O. libertate (Günther, 1867) (Pacific thread herring)
 O. medirastre Berry & Barrett, 1963 (middling thread herring)
 O.oglinum (Lesueur, 1818) (Atlantic thread herring)

References
 

Clupeidae
Marine fish genera
Taxa named by Theodore Gill